Genista aetnensis, the Mount Etna broom, is a species of flowering plant in the legume family Fabaceae. It is a large shrub or small tree endemic to Sicily and Sardinia where it is associated with sunny, open landscapes and poor, stony soil. It is a very common constituent of the garigue plant communities, Mediterranean shrubby vegetation, around the lower slopes of Mount Etna, hence its Latin specific epithet aetnensis.

The young plant is typical of brooms, clothed in narrow linear leaves which soon drop off leaving almost bare branches. As it ages the shrub develops into a shapely small tree with a greenish bark, growing to  if given room to develop. The terminal branches have a tendency to droop and weep. Abundant pea-like, yellow, jasmine-scented flowers cover the whole crown in late summer.

It is sometimes grown in gardens and landscaping, both for flower and for its attractive shape when mature. In cultivation in the UK it has gained the Royal Horticultural Society's Award of Garden Merit.

See also
Brooms
Mediterranean forests, woodlands, and scrub

References

aetnensis
Plants described in 1825
Flora of Sicily
Endemic flora of Italy
Matorral shrubland